Georg Zoidl is an Austrian-Canadian Canada Research Chair for Molecular and Cellular Neuroscience at York University.

References

Year of birth missing (living people)
Living people
Academic staff of York University
German neuroscientists
Canadian neuroscientists
Place of birth missing (living people)
Canada Research Chairs